is a retired Japanese professional baseball submarine pitcher.

Yamada won the Pacific League MVP for three years in a row (1976–1978), sharing a record with Ichiro Suzuki (1994–1996) for the most consecutive awards won. In addition, Yamade won the Japan Series MVP in 1977. He won 20 or more games four times in his career, including notching 26 victories in 1976. Yamada twice won the Pacific League earned run average championship, with marks of 2.37 in 1971 and 2.28 in 1977.

In 2009, Yamada served as a coach for the Japanese team in the World Baseball Classic.

See also 
 List of top Nippon Professional Baseball strikeout pitchers

References

External links

1948 births
Living people
People from Noshiro, Akita
Baseball people from Akita Prefecture
Japanese baseball players
Nippon Professional Baseball pitchers
Hankyu Braves players
Managers of baseball teams in Japan
Chunichi Dragons managers
Nippon Professional Baseball MVP Award winners
Japanese Baseball Hall of Fame inductees